Cerberus Peak is a prominent peak,  high, at the head of Prince Philip Glacier,  northwest of Hunt Mountain, in the Churchill Mountains. The name was suggested by the Holyoake, Cobham and Queen Elizabeth Ranges Party of the New Zealand Geological Survey Antarctic Expedition, 1964–65, after Cerberus, three-headed canine guardian of the gate to Hades in Greek mythology.

References 

Mountains of Oates Land